Unggai-Bena District is a district of the Eastern Highlands Province in Papua New Guinea. Its capital is Bena.

Districts of Eastern Highlands Province